Gaseteria, Inc., also known as ACLU, Indiana, historic apartment building located at Indianapolis, Indiana.  It was built in 1941, and is a one-story, Art Moderne style, buff-color and red brick building with limestone detailing and a flat roof.  It features curved walls and glass-block windows. It was built to house the offices of the Gaseteria filling station company.

It was listed on the National Register of Historic Places in 2013.

References

External links
American Civil Liberties Union of Indiana website

Commercial buildings on the National Register of Historic Places in Indiana
Modernist architecture in Indiana
Commercial buildings completed in 1941
Commercial buildings in Indianapolis
National Register of Historic Places in Indianapolis